The following is List of Universities and Colleges in Heilongjiang.

References
List of Chinese Higher Education Institutions — Ministry of Education
List of Chinese universities, including official links
Heilongjiang Institutions Admitting International Students

 
Heilongjiang